Sailor Moon SuperS: The Movie is a 1995 Japanese animated superhero fantasy film directed by Hiroki Shibata, written by Yōji Enokido, and based on the Sailor Moon manga series by Naoko Takeuchi. It takes its name from the fourth arc of the Sailor Moon anime, Sailor Moon SuperS, as Toei Company distributed it around the same time.

The film was released theatrically in Japan on December 23, 1995, accompanied by a 16-minute short film titled

Plot

Ami's First Love
Japanese theaters showed a 16-minute short before the Sailor Moon SuperS film, titled Ami's First Love (Ami-chan no Hatsukoi), in which Ami Mizuno (Sailor Mercury) struggles to focus on her studying amidst various distractions including a pruritus-inducing love letter found in her school locker and a rival known as "Mercurius" who ties Ami's perfect score in mock high school entrance exams, and who Ami believes is either a female monster that makes her forget math and English or a handsome boy who looks like a young Albert Einstein. The short featured a new transformation sequence into her evolved Super form (Mercury Crystal Power Make Up!) and a greater water-based attack (Mercury Aqua Mirage) for Super Sailor Mercury.

Black Dream Hole
Somewhere in Europe, a young man named  plays a song on his flute to hypnotize children, following him into a mysterious ship before sailing off into the sky. In Tokyo, Usagi Tsukino, Chibiusa, and the other girls bake cookies together at Makoto Kino's apartment. Usagi ends up with cookies that look perfect but taste terrible; Chibiusa produces the reverse. Chibiusa sets out to give her cookies to Mamoru Chiba, but is stopped by a butterfly wing-shaped boy in strange white clothing standing outside the sweets shop. Meanwhile, Usagi visits Mamoru with her cookies, and they argue over his strong and close friendship with Chibiusa. They hear a report on the radio about the mass disappearance of children all over the world. Around the same time, Chibiusa gives her bag of cookies to Perle before going their separate ways.

That night, Chibiusa wakes up, and begins walking through the city. Diana wakes Usagi, who along with the other girls, follow Chibiusa, and the other children. They save Chibiusa, but get into a fight with Poupelin, and his "Bonbon Babies." Poupelin then hypnotizes the girls into seeing a Gingerbread House. Perle says that he no longer believes in her, but she orders that Chibiusa be captured. The ship lands, along with two others, in Marzipan Castle. When the doors are opened, the children run out into the darkness, except for Chibiusa. Looking into the shadows, she witnesses "Dream Coffins," each containing a sleeping child. Badiane lifts her into the air, commenting on the power she senses from Chibiusa, and explains her purpose. In the castle's center, a massive Black Dream Hole is forming, gathering the magical "sugar energy" of the sleeping children. Eventually it will overtake Earth, and all humans will enter into Dream Coffins.

Meanwhile, Perle leads the other Sailor Guardians to a flying ship of his own. He tells them that Badiane promised that the children would be happy and safe in her world of dreams and where they can remain children indefinitely, but he thinks also of Chibiusa, his friend. As they reach the castle, they are attacked, and after crash-landing fight Poupelin, Banane, and Orangeat, as well as three sets of Bonbon Babies. Just when the situation seems hopeless, the girls are saved by Sailor Uranus, Sailor Neptune, and Sailor Pluto. With this advantage, they are able to break the flutes of the three fairies, changing them into small birds. Afterwards, the Guardians infiltrate the castle and confront Queen Badiane, who has drained enough dream energy from the children, including Chibiusa, to create the Black Dream Hole. The power drain is enough to force all the Sailor Soldiers except Usagi into a partial de-transformation, weakening them, without any clothing. Taking Chibiusa with her, Badiane enters the hole itself, and Usagi follows. Usagi then finds herself in Mamoru's apartment, carrying Chibiusa. Mamoru lays her on the bed, then wraps his arms around Usagi and tells her not to worry about anything, just to stay there with him. She asks him again who is more important, herself or Chibiusa; he eventually tells her that she is. Usagi lifts Chibiusa in her arms once again, and eventually realizes that this experience is all just a dream.

As Usagi tries to flee, Queen Badiane demands that she give back Chibiusa. When Usagi refuses, the dark Queen of Dreams assimilates herself into the black dream hole and attacks her with pure fire. Hearing her mental cry, the other seven Guardians send their power and strength to Usagi, awakening Chibiusa and allowing them to finally obliterate Queen Badiane with their combined Moon Gorgeous Meditation technique. After the battle, Marzipan Castle is destroyed, and with Perle's help, the six Super Sailor Guardians and three Outer Sailor Guardians escape. The airships, each carrying children, return to Earth.

Later, at a beach, Perle gives Chibiusa his glass flute, telling her that he is the fairy who protects children's dreams, and will always be with her, and Chibiusa kisses him goodbye on the cheek. As Perle flies away, the six Super Sailor Guardians and three Outer Sailor Guardians watch the sun rise.

Cast

Ami's First Love

Production
Originally, Kunihiko Ikuhara envisaged that Sailor Uranus and Sailor Neptune were going to be the main characters in the SuperS film, and it was going to be independent of the main series.  Sailor Neptune was going to be in a deep sleep at the end of the world, and Sailor Uranus would have had to steal the talismans from the Sailor Soldiers to revive her.  However, both Ikuhara and producer Iriya Azuma left the series. Ikuhara's concepts were later used in Revolutionary Girl Utena.

The film was produced with the same staff from the previous film, with Hiroki Shibata acting as a director, and Hisashi Kagawa in charge of character design and animation direction once again. SuperS writer Yōji Enokido wrote the script for the film. Original creator and mangaka, Naoko Takeuchi provided the character concept for the antagonist, based on Pied Piper of Hamelin.

Release

Japanese release
The film was released in Japanese theaters on December 23, 1995.

The Japanese Blu-ray collection of the three films was released on February 7, 2018, with this film titled Pretty Guardian Sailor Moon SuperS: The Nine Sailor Guardians Unite! Miracle of the Black Dream Hole.

English release
The film was first released in North America on VHS by Pioneer Entertainment on August 31, 1999, in Japanese with English subtitles. Pioneer later released the film to uncut bilingual DVD on August 15, 2000, alongside another VHS release containing an edited version of the English dub. Pioneer re-released their DVD on January 6, 2004, under their "Geneon Signature Series" line. The DVDs later fell out of print when Pioneer/Geneon lost the license to the film. The edited version was also shown on TV in Canada on YTV and in the US on Cartoon Network's Toonami block.

The English dub was produced in association with Optimum Productions in Toronto, Ontario, Canada, and featured most of the original DIC Entertainment English cast reprising their roles. The edited version of the dub was censored for content and replaced the music with cues from the DIC version of the first two seasons of the anime, while retaining the insert song, Sanji no Yosei (The Three O'Clock Fairy). The uncut version of the dub was only seen on the bilingual DVD, featured no censorship, and all of the original Japanese music was left intact, with the exception of the DIC theme song being used. However, no DVD or VHS release contained the "Ami's First Love" short.

In 2014, the film (including the "Ami's First Love" short) was re-licensed for an updated English-language release in North America by Viz Media, who produced a new English dub of the film in association with Studiopolis in Los Angeles, California and plans to re-release it on DVD and Blu-ray. The film, along with the Ami's First Love short, was released to North American theaters in association with Fathom Events for one-day showings nationwide, with dubbed screenings on August 4, 2018 and subtitled screenings on August 6, 2018. It has also been licensed in Australia and New Zealand by Madman Entertainment. The movie was then released on Blu-ray and DVD on February 12, 2019.

See also
Pied Piper of Hamelin
Dream world (plot device)

Note

References

External links 
 
 
 
 

1995 anime films
1990s animated superhero films
1990s Japanese superhero films
1990s teen fantasy films
Anime and manga based on fairy tales
Films about dreams
Films based on Pied Piper of Hamelin
Films scored by Takanori Arisawa
Sailor Moon films